Blaise Bicknell (born 26 November 2001) is an American–Jamaican tennis player.

Bicknell has a career high ATP singles ranking of 762 achieved on 5 December 2022. He also has a career high ATP doubles ranking of 1,211, which was achieved on 8 August 2022. Bicknell has a career high ITF juniors ranking of 96 achieved on 8 April 2019.

Bicknell has represented Jamaica at the Davis Cup.

A member of the University of Florida team since 2019, Bicknell transferred to the University of Tennessee in the fall of 2021.

Challenger and World Tennis Tour Finals

Singles: 1 (0-1)

Davis Cup

Participations: (6–2)

   indicates the outcome of the Davis Cup match followed by the score, date, place of event, the zonal classification and its phase, and the court surface.

References

External links

Florida Gators bio

2001 births
Living people
American male tennis players
Jamaican male tennis players
Florida Gators men's tennis players
Tennessee Volunteers men's tennis players
Tennis players from Miami